Cahaba Heights is a neighborhood of Vestavia Hills, a city in Jefferson County, Alabama, United States.  Before annexation in 2002, it was a census-designated place (CDP) in 1990 and 2000; the population was 5,203 at the 2000 census.

Geography
Cahaba Heights is located at  (33.459256, -86.732086).

Demographics

As of the census of 2000, there were 5,203 people, 2,603 households, and 1,272 families residing in the CDP. The racial makeup of the CDP was 95.94% White, 1.17% Black or African American, 0.21% Native American, 1.44% Asian, 0.37% from other races, and 0.86% from two or more races. 0.75% of the population were Hispanic or Latino of any race.

There were 2,603 households, out of which 19.7% had children under the age of 18 living with them, 38.1% were married couples living together, 8.6% had a female householder with no husband present, and 51.1% were non-families. 41.3% of all households were made up of individuals, and 8.5% had someone living alone who was 65 years of age or older. The average household size was 1.99 and the average family size was 2.75.

In the CDP, the population was spread out, with 17.4% under the age of 18, 10.1% from 18 to 24, 38.4% from 25 to 44, 20.4% from 45 to 64, and 13.7% who were 65 years of age or older. The median age was 35 years. For every 100 females, there were 86.6 males. For every 100 females age 18 and over, there were 84.4 males.

The median income for a household in the CDP was $48,250, and the median income for a family was $61,759. Males had a median income of $41,569 versus $32,674 for females. The per capita income for the CDP was $29,895. About 1.9% of families and 4.3% of the population were below the poverty line, including 2.9% of those under age 18 and 0.9% of those age 65 or over.

References

Neighborhoods in Alabama
Geography of Jefferson County, Alabama
Former census-designated places in Alabama